The Aberto de Bahia is a defunct tennis tournament held in Busca Vida near Salvador, Brazil in 2010. The event was part of the ATP Challenger Tour and has been played on outdoor hard courts.

Past finals

Singles

Doubles

References

External links
Aberto de Bahia tournament on the ITF site

ATP Challenger Tour
Tennis tournaments in Brazil
Hard court tennis tournaments
Sport in Salvador, Bahia